Senator McHenry may refer to:

Henry D. McHenry (1826–1890), Kentucky State Senate
William McHenry (1771–1835), Illinois State Senate